A causal loop also known as  a bootstrap paradox, information loop, ontological paradox, and a predestination paradox is a theoretical proposition, wherein by means of either retrocausality or time travel, an event (an action, information, object, or person) is among the causes of another event, which is in turn among the causes of the first-mentioned event. Such causally looped events then exist in spacetime, but their origin cannot be determined. A hypothetical example of a causality loop is given of a billiard ball striking its past self: the billiard ball moves in a path towards a time machine, and the future self of the billiard ball emerges from the time machine before its past self enters it, giving its past self a glancing blow, altering the past ball's path and causing it to enter the time machine at an angle that would cause its future self to strike its past self the very glancing blow that altered its path. In this sequence of events, the change in the ball's path is its own cause, which might appear paradoxical.

Terminology in physics, philosophy, and fiction

Backwards time travel would allow for causal loops involving events, information, people or objects whose histories form a closed loop, and thus seem to "come from nowhere." The notion of objects or information that are "self-existing" in this way is often viewed as paradoxical, with several authors referring to a causal loop involving information or objects without origin as a  bootstrap paradox, an information paradox, or an ontological paradox. The use of "bootstrap" in this context refers to the expression "pulling yourself up by your bootstraps" and to Robert A. Heinlein's time travel story "By His Bootstraps". The term "time loop" is sometimes referred to as a causal loop, but although they appear similar, causal loops are unchanging and self-originating, whereas time loops are constantly resetting.

An example of a causal loop paradox involving information is given by Allan Everett: suppose a time traveler copies a mathematical proof from a textbook, then travels back in time to meet the mathematician who first published the proof, at a date prior to publication, and allows the mathematician to simply copy the proof. In this case, the information in the proof has no origin. A similar example is given in the television series Doctor Who of a hypothetical time-traveler who copies Beethoven's music from the future and publishes it in Beethoven's time in Beethoven's name. Everett gives the movie Somewhere in Time as an example involving an object with no origin: an old woman gives a watch to a playwright who later travels back in time and meets the same woman when she was young, and gives her the same watch that she will later give to him.

Krasnikov writes that these bootstrap paradoxes – information or an object looping through time – are the same; the primary apparent paradox is a physical system evolving into a state in a way that is not governed by its laws. He does not find this paradoxical, and attributes problems regarding the validity of time travel to other factors in the interpretation of general relativity.

A 1992 paper by physicists Andrei Lossev and Igor Novikov labeled such items without origin as Jinn, with the singular term Jinnee. This terminology was inspired by the Jinn of the Quran, which are described as leaving no trace when they disappear. Lossev and Novikov allowed the term "Jinn" to cover both objects and information with reflexive origin; they called the former "Jinn of the first kind", and the latter "Jinn of the second kind". They point out that an object making circular passage through time must be identical whenever it is brought back to the past, otherwise it would create an inconsistency; the second law of thermodynamics seems to require that the object tends to a lower energy state over the course of its history, and such objects that are identical in repeating points in their history seem to contradict this, but Lossev and Novikov argued that since the second law only requires entropy to increase in closed systems, a Jinnee could interact with its environment in such a way as to regain "lost" entropy. They emphasize that there is no "strict difference" between Jinn of the first and second kind. Krasnikov equivocates between "Jinn", "self-sufficient loops", and "self-existing objects", calling them "lions" or "looping or intruding objects", and asserts that they are no less physical than conventional objects, "which, after all, also could appear only from either infinity, or a singularity."

The term predestination paradox is used in the Star Trek franchise to mean "a time loop in which a time traveler who has gone into the past causes an event that ultimately causes the original future version of the person to go back into the past." This use of the phrase was created for a sequence in a 1996 episode of Star Trek: Deep Space Nine titled "Trials and Tribble-ations", although the phrase had been used previously to refer to belief systems such as Calvinism and some forms of Marxism that encourage followers to strive to produce certain outcomes while at the same time teaching that the outcomes are predetermined. Smeenk and Morgenstern use the term "predestination paradox" to refer specifically to situations in which a time traveler goes back in time to try to prevent some event in the past, but ends up helping to cause that same event.

Self-fulfilling prophecy
A self-fulfilling prophecy may be a form of causality loop. Predestination does not necessarily involve a supernatural power, and could be the result of other "infallible foreknowledge" mechanisms. Problems arising from infallibility and influencing the future are explored in Newcomb's paradox. A notable fictional example of a self-fulfilling prophecy occurs in the classical play Oedipus Rex, in which Oedipus becomes the king of Thebes and in the process unwittingly fulfills a prophecy that he would kill his father and marry his mother. The prophecy itself serves as the impetus for his actions, and thus it is self-fulfilling. The movie 12 Monkeys heavily deals with themes of predestination and the Cassandra complex, where the protagonist who travels back in time explains that he can't change the past.

Novikov self-consistency principle

General relativity permits some exact solutions that allow for time travel. Some of these exact solutions describe universes that contain closed timelike curves, or world lines that lead back to the same point in spacetime. Physicist Igor Dmitriyevich Novikov discussed the possibility of closed timelike curves in his books in 1975 and 1983, offering the opinion that only self-consistent trips back in time would be permitted. In a 1990 paper by Novikov and several others, "Cauchy problem in spacetimes with closed timelike curves", the authors suggested the principle of self-consistency, which states that the only solutions to the laws of physics that can occur locally in the real Universe are those which are globally self-consistent. The authors later concluded that time travel need not lead to unresolvable paradoxes, regardless of what type of object was sent to the past.

Physicist Joseph Polchinski argued that one could avoid questions of free will by considering a potentially paradoxical situation involving a billiard ball sent back in time. In this situation, the ball is fired into a wormhole at an angle such that, if it continues along its course, it will exit in the past at just the right angle to hit its earlier self, knocking it off course, which would stop it from entering the wormhole in the first place. Thorne referred to this problem as "Polchinski's paradox". Two students at Caltech, Fernando Echeverria and Gunnar Klinkhammer, went on to find a solution that avoided any inconsistencies. In the revised scenario, the ball would emerge from the future at a different angle from the one that had generated the paradox, and delivers its past self a glancing blow instead of knocking it completely away from the wormhole. This blow changes its trajectory by just the right degree, meaning it will travel back in time with the angle required to deliver its younger self the necessary glancing blow. Echeverria and Klinkhammer actually found that there was more than one self-consistent solution, with slightly different angles for the glancing blow in each case. Later analysis by Thorne and Robert Forward showed that for certain initial trajectories of the billiard ball, there could actually be an infinite number of self-consistent solutions.

Echeverria, Klinkhammer and Thorne published a paper discussing these results in 1991; in addition, they reported that they had tried to see if they could find any initial conditions for the billiard ball for which there were no self-consistent extensions, but were unable to do so. Thus it is plausible that there exist self-consistent extensions for every possible initial trajectory, although this has not been proven. The lack of constraints on initial conditions only applies to spacetime outside of the chronology-violating region of spacetime; the constraints on the chronology-violating region might prove to be paradoxical, but this is not yet known.

Novikov's views are not widely accepted. Visser views causal loops and Novikov's self-consistency principle as an ad hoc solution, and supposes that there are far more damaging implications of time travel. Krasnikov similarly finds no inherent fault in causal loops, but finds other problems with time travel in general relativity.

Quantum computation with negative delay
Physicist David Deutsch shows in a 1991 paper that quantum computation with a negative delay—backwards time travel—could solve NP problems in polynomial time, and Scott Aaronson later extended this result to show that the model could also be used to solve PSPACE problems in polynomial time. Deutsch shows that quantum computation with a negative delay produces only self-consistent solutions, and the chronology-violating region imposes constraints that are not apparent through classical reasoning. Researchers published in 2014 a simulation validating Deutsch's model with photons. However, it was shown in an article by Tolksdorf and Verch that Deutsch's CTC (closed timelike curve, or a causal loop) fixed point condition can be fulfilled to arbitrary precision in any quantum system described according to relativistic quantum field theory on spacetimes where CTCs are excluded, casting doubts on whether Deutsch's condition is really characteristic of quantum processes mimicking CTCs in the sense of general relativity.
In a later article,
the same authors have shown that  Deutsch's CTC fixed point condition can also be fulfilled in any system
subject to the laws of classical statistical mechanics, even if it is not built up by quantum systems. The authors conclude that hence, 
Deutsch's condition is not specific to quantum physics, nor does it depend on the quantum nature of a physical system so that it can be fulfilled.
In consequence, Tolksdorf and Verch further conclude that Deutsch's condition isn't sufficiently specific to allow statements about time travel scenarios or their hypothetical realization by quantum physics, and that Deutsch's attempt to explain the possibility of his proposed time-travel scenario using the many-world interpretation of quantum mechanics is misleading.

See also

References

Causality
Fiction
Plot (narrative)
Temporal paradoxes